Asota brunnescens is a moth of the family Erebidae first described by Nieuwenhuis in 1948. It is found in Indonesia.

References

Asota (moth)
Moths of Indonesia
Moths described in 1948